Sean Smith (born April 2, 1971) is an American freestyle skier. He competed in the men's moguls event at the 1994 Winter Olympics.

References

External links
 

1971 births
Living people
American male freestyle skiers
Olympic freestyle skiers of the United States
Freestyle skiers at the 1994 Winter Olympics
Sportspeople from London, Ontario